The 2002–03 season was the first season in the history of Vaslui. In what was their inaugural season as a professional club, Victoria Galaţi moved to Vaslui after an agreement between Marius Stan and the Vaslui Municipality to use the Municipal Stadium. The team also changed the colour of its kit, wearing yellow and green striped jerseys for the first time.

Vaslui reached the fourth round of the Romanian Cup, defeating CFR Paşcani at home, before losing to Divizia B side Unirea Focşani. During their inaugural season, Vaslui enjoyed an unbeaten run at home in the league that lasted until 29 March 2003, when Vaslui were beaten by Petrolul Moineşti. Vaslui ended the campaign on 65 points, with a record of 21 wins, 2 draws and 5 losses, and finished as runners-up to Petrolul Moineşti in the league table, which meant the club was promoted to Divizia B. Sorin Frunză was the club's top goalscorer, recording 18 goals, 16 in the league and two in the Romanian Cup.

Background
In July 2002, following the promotion of Victoria Galaţi in Divizia C, president Marius Stan decided to move his team to Vaslui. Set to play in Serie II under the name "Fotbal Club Municipal Vaslui", they ended up playing in Serie I following the withdrawal of Pro Mobila Crucea. Former Jiul Petroşani manager Ioan Sdrobiş was appointed as Vaslui's first manager on 23 July. On 1 August, Vaslui City Council agreed to grant FC Vaslui a 25-year lease of the Municipal Stadium. Unlike Sportul Municipal Vaslui who was left for disaffiliation, FC Vaslui was supported by the city council and businessman Adrian Porumboiu.

Season overview

August–September
With a team assembled over the summer months, Vaslui played their first ever fixture against Poli Unirea Iaşi on 10 August 2002, a game which ended 1–1. The pioneering team consisted of Cristian Brăneț in goal, defenders Cătălin Popa, Sorin Haraga, Cătălin Andruş and Robert Stamate, midfielders Adrian Popa, Emil Trăistariu, Sorin Sava and Sorin Frunză, with Flavius Hâdă and Valentin Badea in attack, while Dumitran, Marcel Atănăsoaiei, Alin Pânzaru, Emanuel Amarandei and Radu Ciobanu were substituted in during the game. Poli Unirea Iaşi scored first through Cătălin Abălaşei in the 30th minute, while Vaslui equalized in the 82nd minute through Dumitran. The club arranged five more friendlies during their training camp in Huşi against FC Oneşti, Petrolul Moineşti, Rafinăria Dărmăneşti, FC Târgu Ocna and Letea Bacău over the course of five days.

Vaslui's first league game was at Gheorghe Costache Stadium against Viitorul Hârlău on 31 August 2002. Vaslui won 3–1 with Amarandei scoring the club's first ever league goal. One week later, Vaslui hosted their first home game at Municipal against Letea Bacău. Flavius Hâdă scored the first goal at Municipal in the 5th minute, while Adrian Popa closed the scoreboard with a late goal, providing Vaslui's first home win. In the following match, Vaslui lost for the first time, against Petrolul Moineşti with Adrian Popa scoring for the second successive league match and Valentin Badea adding one further goal. On 21 September, Vaslui hosted CFR Moldova Iaşi at Municipal; Sorin Frunză scored his first two league goals of the season in a 3–1 win. They ended September level on points with two other clubs, in second place on goal average.

October
On 5 October, Cătălin Andruş scored Vaslui's first ever hat-trick during a five-minute stretch, as Vaslui registered a 7–0 home victory over CFR Paşcani. The club's excellent form continued in their next away match at Cimentul Bicaz, as they gained their third straight win. Another 4–0 win, against Unirea Negreşti, was followed by a comprehensive 9–0 away victory against Ceahlăul Piatra Neamţ II.

Transfers

Transfers in

Squad 
Updated 7 June 2003

Divizia C

League table

Results summary

Matches

Cupa României

References

FC Vaslui seasons
Vaslui